Men's Volleyball Pro Challenge is the second-tier professional league in Thai domestic volleyball tournament. The top 2 are promoted to Men's Volleyball Thailand League at the end of the season. Seasons run from July to September, with teams playing 6 games each. Most games are played on Saturdays and Sundays, with a few games played on weekdays.

Current clubs
 Cosmo Chiang Rai VC
 Khon Kaen Municipality VC
 Nakhonnont VC
 RSU VC
 Sisaket
 Sponxel–MS VC
 Strong Wings–Chiang Mai

Results summary

Titles by team

See also
 Men's Volleyball Thailand League
 Volleyball Thai-Denmark Super League

External links
 Official website